SciFiDimensions was an online science fiction magazine published monthly between February 2000 and February 2010, when it went on hiatus.  It was edited and published by John C. Snider, a long-time genre fan who lives in Roswell, Georgia. SciFiDimensions included interviews, articles and reviews covering books, movies, television shows and comic books.  Beginning in February 2008, the site launched a companion podcast.

Awards
SciFiDimensions received an honorable mention for Best Website in the 2002 Hugo Awards.

References

External links
SciFiDimensions
SciFiDimensions Podcast

Monthly magazines published in the United States
Online magazines published in the United States
Defunct science fiction magazines published in the United States
Magazines established in 2000
Magazines disestablished in 2010
Magazines published in Georgia (U.S. state)